AZN may refer to:

Azerbaijani manat, ISO 4217 code for currency of Azerbaijan
AZN Television
AZN, the IATA code for Andizhan Airport
AZN, the stock ticker symbol for AstraZeneca
Western Durango Nahuatl (ISO 639 azn), a dialect of Mexicanero

Azn may be:
A shorthand form of Asian